Naria macandrewi, common name : MacAndrew's cowry, is a species of sea snail, a cowry, a marine gastropod mollusk in the family Cypraeidae, the cowries.

Description
The shell size varies between 9 mm and 27 mm

Distribution
This species occurs in the Red Sea, Oman, Djibouti and along Eritrea.

References

External links
 Gastropods.com : Naria macandrewi; retrieved 6 January 2019

Cypraeidae
Gastropods described in 1870